Muhlenbach may refer to:

 Muhlenbach, Luxembourg, a quarter in north-western Luxembourg City

See also 
 Mühlenbach (disambiguation)